Vladimir Aleksandrovich Beklemishev (Ekaterinoslav, Russian Empire, now Dnipro, Ukraine - 21 December 1919, Novorzhev, Russia) was a Russian sculptor, a rector of the Imperial Academy of Arts.

Biography

Vladimir Beklemishev was born in Yekaterinoslav Governorate in the family estate of his father, retired hussar colonel Aleksander Beklemishev (Redgio) (1822-1908). Beklemishevs are an old Russian noble family, distant relatives to famous Russian military leaders, Prince Dmitry Pozharsky and Mikhail Kutuzov. Alexander Beklemishev after retirement lived in Rome for many years and even accepted an Italian last name of Redgio. On returning to Russian Empire, Alexander Beklemishev worked as a director and decorator of provincial opera theatres and a watercolour painter.

Soon after the birth of Vladimir the family moved to Kharkov where Vladimir Beklemishev studied in 2nd City Gymnasium. He firstly received his art lessons from his father, then from the local painter Ye.Ye Shraider and from the Art School of M.D. Rayevsky-Ivanova.

In 1878 Beklemishev moved to Saint Petersburg and started his studies at the Imperial Academy of Arts. He chooses the sculpture class. His teachers were Alexander von Bock and Nikolay Laveretsky. In 1885 Beklemishev already had received three Lesser Silver Medals and one Grand Silver Medal from his Academy. In 1886, he received the Academy's Grand Gold Medal for his sculpture "The Entombment" (Положение в Гроб) that gave him his right for a government stipend to study abroad.  In January 1888 he moved to Paris then to Rome. The most remarkable Beklemishev's sculpture of the Rome period is the "Early Christian Woman". She also made his first sculpture portraits then.

In 1892 Beklemishev returned to Russia where for his works made in Rome he received the title of the Academician. The same year he demonstrates his famous sculpture "How Beautiful, How Fresh Were the Roses" named after the story of Ivan Turgenev. In 1894 Beklemishev became a Professor of the Academy. Among his pupils were famous sculptors Anna Golubkina, Matvey Manizer, Leonid Sherwood. In 1900 Beklemishev became a member of the Academy's Council and in 1906 he became the rector of the Sculpture Department of the Academy.

During that time he chiselled a number of sculpture portraits including the sculptures of physicist Nikolay Beketov, painter Konstantin Makovsky, musicians Mitrofan Belyayev and Vasily Safonov. In 1914 he cut a bust of painter Arkhip Kuindzhi that was set on the artist's grave (now on Tikhvin Cemetery in Saint Petersburg).

He also made large sculptures for monuments in public spaces, including monument to Pyotr Ilyich Tchaikovsky for the Saint Petersburg Conservatory (1897), monument to Alexander Griboyedov for the Russian Embassy in Tehran, Iran; monument to Yermak Timofeyevich in Novocherkassk. In 1908 Beklemishev chiselled monument to doctor Sergey Botkin installed at the entrance to the Imperial Military Medical Academy.

In summer 1917 Beklemishev was a member of the commission preparing the new constitution of the Academy and the head of the Petrograd Department for Protections of Historical and Artistic monuments (уполномоченный отдела охраны памятников старины и искусства в Петрограде). On 6 September 1919 he was arrested by Cheka for his membership in the Constitutional Democratic Party. On 18 September 1919 he was released from the jail, on 1 December 1919 he was forced to move from Petrograd (St. Peterburg) to Novorzhev in Pskov Governorate there he died on 21 December 1919.

Works

References

1861 births
1920 deaths
Artists from Dnipro
Sculptors from the Russian Empire
19th-century male artists from the Russian Empire
20th-century Russian sculptors
20th-century Russian male artists
Russian male sculptors
People from Yekaterinoslav Governorate
Ukrainian sculptors
Political repression in Russia
Full Members of the Imperial Academy of Arts
Ukrainian male sculptors